Church Street is an historic street in the English village of Ribchester, Lancashire. Several of its buildings date to the 17th century.

Notable locations on Church Street 

 From north to south

 48 Church Street, Grade II* listed building
 28 and 29 Church Street, Grade II* listed buildings
 2 Church Street, built partly on a Roman fort
 Riverside House, 1 Church Street
 Ribchester Roman Museum
 St Wilfrid's Church

References 

Streets in England